Wysoka  is a village in the administrative district of Gmina Bobowo, within Starogard County, Pomeranian Voivodeship, in northern Poland. It is located within the ethnocultural region of Kociewie in the historic region of Pomerania.

The village has a population of 463.

Wysoka was a royal village of the Polish Crown, administratively located in the Tczew County in the Pomeranian Voivodeship.

During the German occupation of Poland (World War II), several Polish families from Wysoka were expelled and their farms were handed over to Germans as part of the Lebensraum policy.

References

Wysoka